Hezena Lemaletian is a nominated senator in the Kenyan Parliament under the Orange Democratic Movement (ODM). 

She graduated from the University of Nairobi in 2015.

References 

Year of birth missing (living people)
Living people